Television Yamaguchi Broadcasting Systems (テレビ山口, abbreviated TYS) is a Japanese television broadcasting company serving Yamaguchi Prefecture. It is affiliated to the Japan News Network.

External links
 HOMEPAGE

Television stations in Japan
Japan News Network
Mass media in Yamaguchi (city)
Television channels and stations established in 1970